Muta-Yelga (Mutayılğa) is a rural locality (a village) in Mutabashevsky Selsoviet, Askinsky District, Bashkortostan, Russia. The population was 237 as of 2010. There are 5 streets.

Geography 
Muta-Yelga is located 27 km northwest of Askino (the district's administrative centre) by road. Chad is the nearest rural locality.

References 

Rural localities in Askinsky District